The 2011–12 Polska Liga Hokejowa season was the 77th season of the Polska Liga Hokejowa, the top level of ice hockey in Poland. Eight teams participated in the league, and Ciarko PBS Bank Sanok won the championship.

Regular season

Playoffs

Play-downs 
 GKS Tychy - MMKS Podhale Nowy Targ 4:1
 Zagłębie Sosnowiec - KS Toruń 4:3

5th place
 GKS Tychy - Zagłębie Sosnowiec 10:1 (Over two games)

7th place 
 KS Toruń - MMKS Podhale Nowy Targ 4:1

MMKS Podhale Nowy Targ is relegated to the Polish 1. Liga

External links
 Full results

Polska Hokej Liga seasons
Polska
Polska